Dobrzanówka  is a village in the administrative district of Gmina Tomaszów Lubelski in eastern Poland. The administrative district where it is located is within Tomaszów Lubelski County of Lublin Voivodeship.

References

Villages in Tomaszów Lubelski County